Mineral Township is an inactive township in Jasper County, in the U.S. state of Missouri.

Mineral Township was so named on account of local mining activities.

References

Townships in Missouri
Townships in Jasper County, Missouri